Årset in Vartdal is a farming area in Ørsta municipality in Møre og Romsdal in Norway. It is situated in Årsetdalen, about 3 km up the Storelva river from Vartdal.

It was first mentioned in 1520 in the tax records. In 1606, there were four farms, a number which remained largely unchanged for centuries. There is a lot of uncultivated land and pasture on the sunny side, which was used in earlier times for hayfields.

Årset had seats on Årsetstøylen in Årsetdalen, 4–5 km from the township and at Årsetgjerdet on the opposite side of the Storelva river which is crossed by a bridge at Årsethølen (Årset pool).

There was a boathouse at Årsetvika by Vartdalsfjorden until 1998 .

Population

 1801: 30 persons - (5 homes)
 1865: 23 people - (4 homes)
 1900: 45 persons - (7 homes)

Sources

 Johannes Buset, Vartdalssoga. Første bandet. 1964
 Ivar Grøvik, Vartdalssoga. II. 1983
 Censuses of 1801, 1865 and 1900

Ørsta